Toimi Tulikoura (19 February 1905 – 30 July 1983) was a Finnish athlete. He competed in the men's long jump and the men's triple jump at the 1928 Summer Olympics.

References

External links

1905 births
1983 deaths
Athletes (track and field) at the 1928 Summer Olympics
Finnish male long jumpers
Finnish male triple jumpers
Olympic athletes of Finland